The coastline of Brazil measures 7,491 km, which makes it the 16th longest national coastline of the world. All the coast lies adjacent to the Atlantic Ocean.

A considerable number of geographical features can be found all through the coastal areas, like islands, reefs and bays. The beaches of Brazil (2095 in total) are famous in the world and receive a great number of tourists.

A famous expression in Brazil is "from Oiapoque to Chuí", which means from the extreme south to the extreme north of the country. However, the actual northernmost point in Brazil is the Monte Caburaí in the far from the coast state of Roraima, whereas the southernmost point is in Santa Vitória do Palmar, the city from which Chuí emancipated.

Out of the 26 Brazilian states, 9 are landlocked, as well as the Distrito Federal. Most of the 17 coastal states have their capitals lying near the coast, exceptions being Porto Alegre (Rio Grande do Sul), Curitiba (Paraná), São Paulo (São Paulo), Teresina (Piauí), Belém (Pará) and Macapá (Amapá). Porto Alegre, Belém, Teresina and Macapá lie all near large navigable rivers, though.

From South to North 

The southernmost point of Brazil is located near the sea, at the border with Uruguay, within the municipality of Santa Vitória do Palmar. A few kilometers to the north lies the Praia do Cassino, which is 245 km long (though other sources measure it as 212 km long). It is considered (especially by those within the country) to be the longest beach in the world, although other beaches around the globe are also put forward as the record holders. Nevertheless, it is indeed the longest in Brazil. Except for the very small rocky island of Ilha dos Lobos in Torres, the coastline of Rio Grande do Sul is completely devoid of islands.

Florianópolis, the capital of Santa Catarina, is located at one of the largest coastal islands of Brazil, the Ilha de Santa Catarina, with an area of 424,4 km². The Serra do Mar mountain range starts in Santa Catarina, and runs along the coastlines of Paraná, São Paulo, Rio de Janeiro and Espírito Santo.

The coastline of Paraná is small if compared to other states. However, it is very diverse geographically, with a considerable number of islands and bays.

In São Paulo, there are famous coastal cities like Guarujá, São Sebastião and Ilhabela. The northern half of the coastline of São Paulo, as well as half the coastline of Rio de Janeiro are the only ones in Brazil to face the south (if small bays and islands spread in the rest of the country are not taken into account).

The state of Rio de Janeiro's coastline is remarkable for the worldwide known beaches in the capital city, like Ipanema and Copacabana. Also, the state features the Campos Basin, the largest petroleum rich area in Brazil, measuring 100,000 km² and producing 1.49 million barrels of oil every day. The basin extends to the coastline of Espírito Santo. 1,200 km east of Vitória, in Espírito Santo, lie the islands of Trindade and Martim Vaz.

Bahia has the longest coastline of the Brazilian states, and also the greatest number of coastal municipalities. Porto Seguro is regarded as the first place in which Pedro Álvares Cabral, discoverer of Brazil, set foot. Salvador was the first capital of Brazil, and still boasts well-preserved buildings of the colonial and imperial periods of Brazil.

From Sergipe to Ceará, the landscape changes little. The majority of the coastal areas have few or no mountains, whereas most of the islands are separated from the continent only by narrow channels. Temperatures are rather warm during most of the year, with moderate winds blowing frequently.

Piauí has a coastline of only some 60 km, the shortest of the country. Four cities (Cajueiro da Praia, Ilha Grande Luís Correia and Parnaíba) make up the coast of the state.

In Maranhão, some unique geographical features (like the Lençóis Maranhenses) are present. The area between Maranhão and Pará is dominated by the "Reentrâncias Maranhenses", a landform similar to a fjord but shorter, narrower and lower. Because of this particular geography, there are almost no beaches at this section of the Brazilian coastline.

Half the coastline of Pará is composed of the mouth of the Amazon River, which flows towards the sea around the Marajó island, the largest island surrounded by fresh water in the world. The outflow of the Amazon river is so strong that the ocean waters in the north and northeast faces of the island have almost no salt.

Amapá's coastline is almost 600 km long, but there are only three beaches: Fazendinha, Boca do Inferno and Goiabal. The coastline of Brazil ends at Cape Orange, in the city of Oiapoque.

See also 

 Geography of Brazil
 List of beaches in Brazil
 List of islands of Brazil

Notes

References